The Polish Embassy in Dublin is the diplomatic mission of the Republic of Poland in Ireland. It is located in the capital city of Ireland, Dublin.

As of October 2019, the current Polish Ambassador to Ireland is Anna Sochańska.

The embassy is also represented by an Honorary Consul in the western city of Limerick.

See also
 Ireland–Poland relations
 List of ambassadors of Poland to Ireland
 Foreign relations of Ireland
 List of diplomatic missions in Ireland

References

Diplomatic missions in Dublin (city)
Diplomatic missions of Poland
Ireland–Poland relations